P'iq'iñ Q'ara (Aymara p'iq'iña head, q'ara bare, bald, p'iq'iña q'ara bald, "baldheaded", also spelled Pequen Khara, Phequen Khara) is a  mountain in the Andes of Bolivia. It is situated in the La Paz Department, Murillo Province, Mecapaca Municipality.

References 

Mountains of La Paz Department (Bolivia)